Izet Rustemovych Hdanov (born 16 September 1983, in Fergana, Uzbek SSR), is a Ukrainian politician and activist of Crimean Tatar ethnicity born to deported Crimean Tatars in the Soviet Uzbekistan.

In 2006 Hdanov graduated from the National Academy of the State Tax Service of Ukraine. In 2009–2011 he served as a deputy minister in the Crimean Government. In 2012 Hdanov suffered an assassination attempt when two unknown younger people hit him on the head with a hammer.

In 2015 Hdanov was among the leaders of an energy blockade with the Russian occupied Crimea.

As a leader of the "Community council in Crimean affairs" and a representative of Mejlis of the Crimean Tatar People was very critical about former presidential representative of Ukraine in Crimea Natalia Popovych.

In 2017 he was appointed as the first deputy presidential representative of Ukraine in Crimea. Following removal of Babin, Hdanov ex officio acts as presidential representative of Ukraine in Crimea.

References

External links
 Management . Office of the Permanent representative of the President of Ukraine of the Autonomous Republic of Ukraine.
 Plamenev, V. Secrets of the Kherson farmstead. Part two: Henichesk commandos (Тайны Херсонского подворья. Часть вторая: Генические коммандос). Novosti Khersonschiny. 2018

1983 births
Living people
People from Fergana
Uzbekistani people of Crimean Tatar descent
Uzbekistani emigrants to Ukraine
Crimean Tatar independence activists
Ukrainian politicians
Presidential representatives of Ukraine in Crimea
Ukrainian exiles of the annexation of Crimea by the Russian Federation